was a Japanese volleyball player. She was a member of the Japanese winning teams, at the 1962 World Championships and 1964 Summer Olympics.

She died at 72 in 2016. It is reported by THE SANKEI NEWS that she lost her parents because of World War II but never lost her patience, warm personality and strength.

References

External links
 Video of 1964 Tokyo Olympics Women's Volleyball（the person who appears as the 1st Japanese server and 2nd Japanese spiker in this video）
 Sata Maruyama (née Isobe) passed away at 72. (The second player from the right in the photograph) / THE MAINICHI NEWSPAPERS

1944 births
2016 deaths
Olympic volleyball players of Japan
Volleyball players at the 1964 Summer Olympics
Olympic gold medalists for Japan
Japanese women's volleyball players
Olympic medalists in volleyball
Medalists at the 1964 Summer Olympics